Correzzana (Milanese: Corresan) is a comune (municipality) in the Province of Monza and Brianza in the Italian region of Lombardy, located about  northeast of Milan.

Correzzana borders the following municipalities: Besana in Brianza, Casatenovo, Triuggio, Lesmo.

References

External links
Official website